Prasad V. Bharatam is Professor of Medicinal Chemistry at the National Institute of Pharmaceutical Education and Research, S.A.S. Nagar, India. His area of research include Quantum Medicinal Chemistry, Pharmacoinformatics,
synthesis of computationally designed molecules (anti-diabetic belonging to class PPAR-γ agonist and biguanides), drug delivery using dendrimers.

Awards
 Fellowship of Alexander von Humboldt Stiftung, Bonn
 IBM Faculty Award
 Fellowship of Royal Society of Chemistry(FRSC), London
 Chem. Research Society of India – Medal
 Indian Academy of Sciences Fellowship  
 Ranbaxy Research Award
 OPPI Scientist Award
 Fellowship of Andhra Pradesh Akademi of Sciences

References

1962 births
Academic staff of the National Institute of Pharmaceutical Education and Research
Living people